Béla G. Lipták (born June 7, 1936, in Hungary) is a Hungarian engineer consultant specializing in the fields of safety, automation, process control, optimization and renewable energy. He is the editor-in-chief of the Instrument and Automation Engineer's Handbook. His handbook and other works in the field of automation have become important in the automation field.

Biography
Lipták was born in Hungary on June 7, 1936. He entered the United States as a refugee of the Hungarian Revolution of 1956.

Education
Lipták received a scholarship at the Stevens Institute of Technology (1959) and a master's degree from CCNY (1962). He also holds graduate courses in computer science at Pratt Institute (1965).

Awards and honors
Béla G. Lipták is a Fellow Member (1973) of the International Society of Automation. He is also included in the Process Automation Hall of Fame by the Control Global media portal.

References

External links

Béla Lipták webpage

1936 births
Living people
City College of New York alumni
Hungarian engineers
Stevens Institute of Technology alumni
Pratt Institute alumni